Clearing Skies (lit. "A Clearing on the River") is a Canadian short drama film, directed by Rosa Zacharie and released in 2002. The film stars Jean Lapointe and Isabel Richer as a father and daughter who are struggling to heal their tense and fraught relationship.

The film premiered at the Abitibi-Témiscamingue International Film Festival in October 2002.

It was a Genie Award nominee for Best Live Action Short Drama at the 23rd Genie Awards in 2003. It was later screened at the 2003 CFC Worldwide Short Film Festival, where it won the award for Best Cinematography in a Canadian Short Film.

It was subsequently distributed as a bonus feature on the DVD release of the theatrical feature film Looking for Alexander (Mémoires affectives).

References

External links

2002 films
2002 short films
Canadian drama short films
2000s Canadian films
French-language Canadian films